Jan-Mikael Juutilainen (born January 5, 1988) is a Finnish former professional ice hockey player who played with Jokerit, HPK and KooKoo of the Finnish Liiga. He was originally selected by the Chicago Blackhawks in the 6th round (156th overall) of the 2006 NHL Entry Draft.

References

External links

1988 births
Living people
Chicago Blackhawks draft picks
Finnish ice hockey forwards
HPK players
Jokerit players
Kiekko-Vantaa players
KooKoo players
Waterloo Black Hawks players
Sportspeople from Espoo